The Generalized Maxwell model also known as the Maxwell–Wiechert model (after James Clerk Maxwell and E Wiechert) is the most general form of the linear model for viscoelasticity. In this model several Maxwell elements are assembled in parallel. It takes into account that the relaxation does not occur at a single time, but in a set of times.  Due to the presence of molecular segments of different lengths, with shorter ones contributing less than longer ones, there is a varying time distribution.  The Wiechert model shows this by having as many spring–dashpot Maxwell elements as are necessary to accurately represent the distribution.  The figure on the right shows the generalised Wiechert model.

General model form

Solids
Given  elements with moduli , viscosities , and relaxation times 

The general form for the model for solids is given by :

Example: standard linear solid model
Following the above model with  elements yields the standard linear solid model:

Fluids
Given  elements with moduli , viscosities , and relaxation times 

The general form for the model for fluids is given by:

Example: three parameter fluid
The analogous model to the standard linear solid model is the three parameter fluid, also known as the Jeffreys model:

References

Materials science
Non-Newtonian fluids
James Clerk Maxwell